Mark Vandewyer (born 10 September 1972) is a Belgian sprint canoer who has competed in the mid-1990s.  At the 1996 Summer Olympics in Atlanta, he was eliminated in the semifinals of the K-2 500 m event and the repechages of the K-2 1000 m event.

References
 Sports-Reference.com profile

1972 births
Belgian male canoeists
Canoeists at the 1996 Summer Olympics
Living people
Olympic canoeists of Belgium